= Super Head Magazine Zoo =

Japanese music magazine

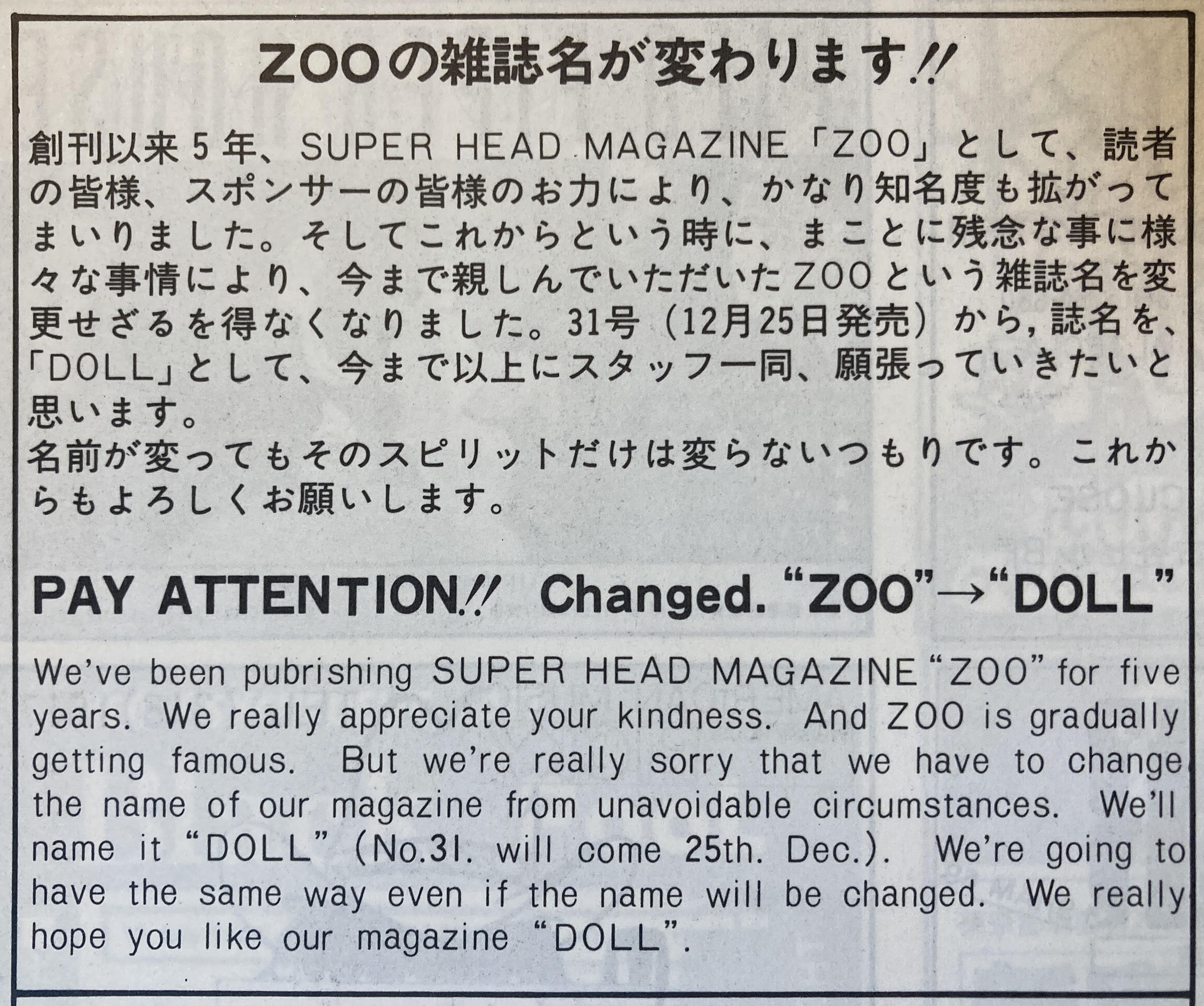
Zoo name change announcement to Doll. Super Head Magazine Zoo (1980, October 25). Issue No. 30, p. 80.

Super Head Magazine Zoo was a bimonthly modern music magazine published in Japan from July 1975 to October 1980. In total, 30 issues were published.

It was published by Zoo Super Head Directors Tokyo.

The editor-in-chief of Zoo was Mikio Moriwaki.

On the final page of its last issue (1980 Issue 30), it published an announcement that the magazine's name would be changing from Zoo to Doll. The announcement explains that it is simply a name change (as it states "We're going to have it the same way even if the name will be changed"). However, the focus of the magazine gradually did change, from a rock magazine which featured a dedicated section to punk (Zoo) to a mainly punk music magazine (Doll).

The magazine covered rock (The Rolling Stones in Issue 4), psychedelic rock (Pink Floyd in Issue 3), arena rock (Boston in Issue 18), and folk music (Jackson Browne in Issue 4) in its early years. Subsequent years saw more and more coverage of punk music and new wave (Talking Heads in Issue 18, Devo in Issue 22). Most coverage was on music from overseas, but the magazine did also cover some domestic bands, such as P-Model (Issue 23), Hikashu (Issue 26), and Friction and Arb (Issue 28). It also eventually had dedicated sections of the magazine that covered punk music, which eventually became its main focus when it transitioned into the magazine Super Head Magazine Doll. An early example of punk coverage is in its 1976 Issue 6 article covering The Ramones. It is also said to have been one of the early publications to discuss the concept of heavy metal music.
